The Chengdu Open is a men's ATP Tour 250 series tournament played on outdoor hard courts. It was a new tournament added to the 2016 ATP World Tour and replaces the ATP Malaysian Open event held in Kuala Lumpur. It takes place at the Sichuan International Tennis Center in Chengdu, China.

Results

Singles

Doubles

References

 
Tennis tournaments in China
Hard court tennis tournaments
Sport in Chengdu
2016 establishments in China
Recurring sporting events established in 2016